John Carlos Frey (born November 3, 1969) is a six time Emmy Award winning Mexican-American freelance investigative journalist and documentary filmmaker and published author based in Los Angeles, California. His investigative work has been featured on programs and networks such as 60 Minutes, PBS, NBC News, CBS News, the Weather Channel, Dan Rather Reports, Fusion TV, Current TV, Univision, and Telemundo. John Carlos Frey has also written articles for the Los Angeles Times, the Huffington Post, Salon, Need to Know online, the Washington Monthly, and El Diario (in Spanish). 
 
John Carlos Frey is also the author of the book, Sand and Blood about the stealth war on the US Mexico border.

Personal
Frey was born in Tijuana, Mexico. His father was Swiss-American and his mother was a naturalized US citizen of Mexican descent. His family moved to San Diego, California, where he attended parochial schools, and later studied film and graduated from the University of San Diego. Early in his life, Frey sought to hide his Mexican heritage. "I wanted to pass as American, I didn’t want to accept that I was part Mexican," Frey said. "It was really easy to leave my culture behind." Frey's mother was once picked up by US Border Patrol agents and deported because she was unable to convince them of her legal status.

Acting Career
Before becoming a documentary filmmaker and journalist, Frey was also an actor for several years. His acting career includes appearances in shows such as The Practice, Days of Our Lives, Married... with Children, JAG, Weird Science, Party of Five, and the film Freaky Friday, among other credits.

Documentaries
Frey's independently produced documentaries include Invisible Mexicans of Deer Canyon, The Invisible Chapel,  The 800 Mile Wall, One Border One Body, and Life and Death on the Border.

Frey was the main correspondent for the February 15, 2013, episode of PBS's "Need To Know" titled "Outlawed In Arizona", highlighting a years-long dispute over a Mexican-American studies program in Tucson, Arizona.

Awards
 2019 Emmy Award Winner for Best Business Report
 2019 Edward R. Murrow Award for Overall Excellence
 2018 Emmy Award Winner for Best Business Report
 2018 Emmy Award Nomination for Best Investigative Report in a News Magazine
 2018 Emmy Award Nomination for Best Business Report
 2018 Edward R. Murrow Award for Best Documentary
 2018 GLAAD Award Nominee - Best Journalism - News Magazine 
 2017 Emmy Award Winner - Best Investigative Report 
 2017 Society of Professional Journalists - Florida-Best Investigative Reporting 
 2017 Headliner Award for First Place Best Documentary or Series
 2017 Headliner Award for First Place Best of Show
 2017 Loeb Award for "The Source"
 2017 Edward R. Murrow Award for "Aspirist"
 2017 New York Press Club Documentary Award for "The Source"
 2017 Society of American Business Writers and Editors Top Prize for "The Source" - Newsroom Category
 2016 Eppy Award for Best Collaborative Investigative/Enterprise Reporting                
 2016 Emmy Award Recipient for Best Innovative Reporting
 2016 Society of Professional Journalists Sigma Delta Chi Award for Best Investigative Report in a Magazine
 2015 Emmy Award Recipient for Best Spanish Language Television Report
 2015 Investigative Reporters and Editors Medal (IRE Medal) - Best Television Investigation - National
 2015 New York Press Club - Best TV Documentary
 2015 Society of Professional Journalists - New America Award
 2015 Society of Professional Journalists - Sigma Delta Chi Award for Best Documentary
 2015 Investigative Reporters and Editors (IRE) Medal for Best Investigative Reporting for Television
 2015 George Polk Award for Best Television Reporting
 2015 Clarion Award for Television Reporting
 2015 Editor and Publishers Award "Eppy" for Best Investigative Report
 2014 Emmy Award Recipient for Best Continuing Coverage of a News Story
 2014 IF Stone Award (Izzy) for Outstanding Independent Journalism
 2014 National Headliner Award for PBS "Dying to Get Back"
 2014 National Headliner Award for Washington Monthly Article, "Crossing the Line"
 2013 Emmy Award Nomination for Outstanding Investigative Journalism in a News Magazine
 2013 Emmy Award Nomination for Best Report in a News Magazine
 2013 Sidney Award for Socially Conscious Journalism
 2013 Clarion Award for Best Television Investigative Feature
 2013 Society of Professional Journalists - Sigma Delta Chi Award for Best Investigative Reporting for Television
 2012 Scripps Howard Award for Broadcast Journalism

References

External links
 John Carlos Frey on Twitter
 John Carlos Frey on Facebook
 The Gatekeeper trailer, on Youtube
 - TheInvestigativeFund "The Backstory: John Carlos Frey"

Living people
Mexican film directors
People from Tijuana
Mexican journalists
Male journalists
Emmy Award winners
Writers from Baja California
People with acquired American citizenship
1969 births
Gerald Loeb Award winners for Audio and Video